The Jean-Pellez Stadium is an indoor stadium of athletics of 6 462   m2 located in the greater Clermont-Ferrand in the commune of Aubière.  It was inaugurated on 28 September 2002 by Serge Godard, Mayor of Clermont-Ferrand. This indoor stadium has hosted several times the Indoor Athletics  Championships Of France.

History  
The stadium is named for Jean Pellez, an athlete born in 1939 in Auvergne Valenciennes and who died in September 1998, who ran in several tournaments including the 800 meters in 1963.

Characteristics  
It hosts regional, national, and even global athletic competitions, including the Athletics Indoor Championships in France.

Other sports are practiced like gymnastics or fencing.

Numbers  
  Its occupancy rate has reached 97% which is the highest  for an indoor  French stadium[ref. obsolete]   
 Capacity 2 700  places

notes and references

Annexes  
 : document used as a source for writing this article.

Athletics (track and field) venues in France
Sports venues completed in 2002
Sports venues in Puy-de-Dôme
Sports venues in Clermont-Ferrand
21st-century architecture in France